The Turkish Medical Association (abbreviated as  TTB) is the professional association and registered trade union for doctors in Turkey. Its membership of 110,000 as of the year 2020, covers 80% of Turkey's doctors. It is affiliated to the World Medical Association.

Membership is compulsory for self-employed doctors, but not for those employed by the government. Its main source of income is membership fees, which are regulated by the Ministry of Health, but it does not receive any support from the government.

In 2012, the Turkish government created a new organization, the "Board for Health Professions", giving it many of the responsibilities the TTB previously had, including maintaining and enforcing ethics codes. The TTB was entitled to appoint one of the board's 15 members, with the rest appointed by the government.

On January 30, 2018, several senior members, including the TTB's chairman, Raşit Tükel, were arrested after criticizing the Turkish military operation in Afrin.

Chairman
 2020–present day: Prof. Dr. Şebnem Korur Fincancı
 2018–2020: Prof. Dr. Sinan Adıyaman
 2016–2018: Prof. Dr. Raşit Tükel
 2014–2016: Dr. Bayazıt İlhan
 2012–2014: Prof. Dr. Ahmet Özdemir Aktan
 2010–2012: Dr. Eriş Bilaloğlu
 2006–2010: Prof. Dr. Gençay Gürsoy
 1996–2006: Dr. Füsun Sayek
 1990–1996: Dr. Selim Ölçer
 1984–1990: Prof. Dr. Nusret Fişek

See also
 Health care in Turkey

References

External links
 

Medical associations
Trade unions in Turkey
Organizations established in 1953
1953 establishments in Turkey
Medical and health organizations based in Turkey